Cardiac nursing is a nursing specialty that works with patients who suffer from various conditions of the cardiovascular system. Cardiac nurses help treat conditions such as unstable angina, cardiomyopathy, coronary artery disease, congestive heart failure, myocardial infarction and cardiac dysrhythmia under the direction of a cardiologist.

Cardiac nurses perform postoperative care on a surgical unit, stress test evaluations, cardiac monitoring, vascular monitoring, and health assessments. Cardiac nurses must have Basic Life Support and Advanced Cardiac Life Support certification. In addition, cardiac nurses must possess specialized skills including electrocardiogram monitoring, defibrillation, and medication administration by continuous intravenous drip.
Cardiac nurses work in many different environments, including coronary care units (CCU), cardiac catheterization, intensive care units (ICU), operating theatres, cardiac rehabilitation centers, clinical research, cardiac surgery wards, cardiovascular intensive care units (CVICU), and cardiac medical wards.

Certification for cardiac nurses 
All cardiac nurses are registered nurses. In the past, the American Nurses Credentialing Center (ANCC) offered certification in Cardiac Rehabilitation Nursing. However, ANCC has retired that exam, and the certification is no longer available, except to nurses who already have the certification and want to renew it.

the American Nurses Credentialing Center (ANCC) did not discontinue Cardiac certification.  The ANCC replaced it with the Cardiac-Vascular Nursing exam to earn Cardiac certification.
Cardiac-Vascular Nursing	RN-BC
Certified Vascular Nurse (retired exam)	RN-BC

See also 
 British Journal of Cardiac Nursing

References

Novotny, J (2003). "101 Careers in Nursing", Springer Publishing Company.

External links
 Society for Vascular Nursing
 American Association of Cardiovascular and Pulmonary Rehabilitation
 Preventive Cardiovascular Nurses Association

Nursing specialties